Phalonidia cholovalva is a species of moth of the family Tortricidae. It is found in Venezuela.

The wingspan is about 35 mm. The ground colour of the forewings is pale brownish cream, densely sprinkled and suffused with brownish especially along the dorsum. The hindwings are cream, slightly tinged with brownish apically and with fine brownish strigulation (fine streaks).

Etymology
The species name refers to the asymmetry of the sacculus and is derived from Greek cholo (meaning lame).

References

Moths described in 2006
Phalonidia